Samba (also Romanized as Sambā and Sombā) is a village in Kuh Yakhab Rural District, Dastgerdan District, Tabas County, South Khorasan Province, Iran. At the 2006 census, its population was 151, in 28 families.

References 

Populated places in Tabas County